The 1979 European Rugby League Championship was a three-way tournament between the national rugby league football teams of England, France and Wales.

Squads
Source:

France
Guy Alard
Jean-Marc Bourret
Delphin Castanon
Henri Daniel
Jean-Marc Gonzalès
Didier Hermet
Guy Laforgue
Christian Laumond
Michel Maïque
André Malacamp
José Moya
Michel Naudo
Jean-Pierre Siré
Alain Touchagues
Francis Tranier
Éric Waligunda
Charles Zalduendo

England
Michael Adams
Barry Banks
Harry Beverley
Steve Evans
Peter Glynn
Jeff Grayshon
Phil Hogan
Eric Hughes
Ken Kelly
Graham Liptrot
Brian Lockwood
Thomas Martyn
Keith Mumby
Alan Redfearn
Kevin Smyth
Keith Smith
Gary Stephens
Eddie Szymala
Keith Tindall
David Watkinson
John Woods
Stuart Wright

Wales
John Bevan
Harold Box
Tommy Cunningham
Bill Francis
Mel James
Graeme Johns
Brian Juliff
Roy Mathias
Jim Mills
Mick Murphy
Mike Nicholas
Paul Prendiville
John Risman
Peter Rowe
Trevor Skerrett
Clive Sullivan
David Watkins
Paul Woods

Venues

Results

Final standings

England win the tournament with two victories.

References

European Nations Cup
International rugby league competitions hosted by the United Kingdom
International rugby league competitions hosted by France
European Rugby League Championship
European Rugby League Championship
European Rugby League Championship
European rugby league championship